Señorita Panamá 1997, the 15th Señorita Panamá pageant and 32nd celebration of the Miss Panamá contest, was held in Teatro Anayansi Centro de Convenciones Atlapa, Panama City, Panama, on Saturday, August 30, 1997, after weeks of events. The winner of the pageant was Tanisha Drummond.

The pageant was broadcast live on RPC-TV Panamá. About 14 contestants from all over Panamá competed for the prestigious crown. At the conclusion of the final night of competition, outgoing titleholder Lía Victoria Borrero González of Los Santos crowned Tanisha Tamara Drummond Johnson of Colon as the new Señorita Panamá.

In the same night was celebrated the election of the "Señorita Panamá World",  was announced the winner of the Señorita Panamá Mundo title. Señorita Panamá World 1996 Norma Elida Pérez of Panama Centro crowned Patricia Aurora Bremner Hernández of Panama Centro as the new Señorita Panamá World. Also was selected the representative for the Nuestra Belleza Internacional pageant Iris Avila Moreno of Panama Centro was crowned by Amelie González Assereto Nuestra Belleza Internacional Panamá 1996.

Drummond competed in the 47th edition, Miss Universe 1998 pageant, held at the Stan Sheriff Arena, Honolulu, Hawaii, United States on May 12, 1998.

Also Bremner Hernández competed in Miss World 1997,the 47th edition of the Miss World pageant, was held on 22 November 1997 in Baie Lazare, Seychelles. Avila Moreno competed in Nuestra Belleza Internacional 1997 pageant, the 4th and final edition of Nuestra Belleza Internacional  Pageant held on November 21, 1997 in Miami, United States.

Final result

Special awards

Contestants 
These are the competitors who have been selected this year.

Election schedule

Saturday 30 August Final night, coronation Señorita Panamá 1997

Candidates notes

Tanisha Drummond also competed for Panamá in the Miss Caraïbes Hibiscus 1998 and won the title. This is the first title for Panamá in this pageant.

Historical significance

Colón won Señorita Panamá for third time, the first time with Sonia Inés Ríos (1965) and second with Gloria Karamañites ( 1980).

References

External links
  Señorita Panamá  official website

Señorita Panamá
1997 beauty pageants